Seasons Bleedings is an EP by Holy Grail released in 2011 under Prosthetic Records.

Track listing

Personnel 
Blake Mount - bass
Tyler Meahl - drums
Eli Santana - guitars 
James Paul Luna - vocals
Alex Lee - guitars

References 

2011 EPs
Holy Grail (band) albums